Lepista glaucocana is a species of fungus belonging to the family Tricholomataceae.

It is native to Europe and Northern America.

References

glaucocana